Sten Olsson (8 February 1944 - 7 March 2008 was a Swedish handball player, goal keeper, who competed in the 1972 Summer Olympics.

In 1972 he was part of the Swedish team which finished seventh in the Olympic tournament. He played three matches.

References

1944 births
2008 deaths
Swedish male handball players
Olympic handball players of Sweden
Handball players at the 1972 Summer Olympics
IFK Kristianstad players